William Bromley (1663 – 13 February 1732) of Baginton, Warwickshire, was an English Tory politician who sat in the English and British House of Commons between 1690 and 1732. He was Speaker of the House of Commons of Great Britain from 1710 to 1713 and Secretary of State for the Northern Department from 1713 to 1714.

Bromley was a Hanoverian Tory who supported the Hanoverian Succession in 1714.

Early life
Bromley was the son of Sir William Bromley (died 1682) of Baginton, and his wife Ursula Leigh, daughter of Thomas Leigh, 1st Baron Leigh of Stoneleigh, Warwickshire. He was born at the family seat at Baginton, Warwickshire, and was baptized on 31 August 1663.

He matriculated at Christ Church, Oxford in 1679, and graduated B.A. in 1681 (he was later awarded a D.C.L. in 1702). In 1683, he was admitted as a student of the Middle Temple.

Political career

Bromley missed the Glorious Revolution because he was travelling in France and Italy in 1688, following the death of his first wife in 1688 (he eventually married four times). Upon his return to England he embarked on a political career. Throughout his time in public life Bromley was a staunch high church Tory with a reputation for honesty and extreme partisanship. His political rivals sometimes found it useful to allege Jacobite sympathies and to refer to Bromley's travel memoirs Remarks on the Grand Tour of France and Italy to support that allegation.

At the 1690 English general election Bromley was returned as knight of the shire (MP) for Warwickshire. An able debater, his reputation rose rapidly; particularly amongst the Tory squires who shared similar prejudices. In 1696 Bromley refused to take an oath to swear that William III was the rightful and lawful King. As a result, he was incapacitated from serving in Parliament and was not re-elected for Warwickshire in 1698.

Bromley returned to Parliament for the strongly High Tory constituency of Oxford University, at a by-election in March 1701, after which Bromley was a leading figure in the Tory ranks. He continued to hold one of the university's two seats for the rest of his life.

Bromley was a strong opponent of occasional conformity by religious dissenters, who attended Church of England services often enough to avoid the legal penalties imposed by the Test and Corporation Acts. Bromley promoted several bills to strengthen the law, but they were not adopted.

From 1702 to 1705 Bromley was the Chairman of the Committee of Privileges and Elections of the House of Commons. In 1705 he was a candidate for the Speakership. On this occasion a new edition of Bromley's travel memoirs was produced by his political enemies (with an added table pointing the reader to the alleged pro-Catholic and Jacobite passages in the book). Bromley did not become Speaker in 1705.

Following the 1710 election there was a large Tory majority in the House of Commons. On 25 November 1710 Bromley was elected Speaker, without opposition. He was sworn in as a member of the Privy Council in 1711.

In his position as Speaker in 1713, Bromley responded to questions from a Scottish MP with the infamous reply that
"they had catcht hold of Scotland, they wou'd keep her fast.", thereby given credence to the widely held belief in Scotland that Union was a means for England to assert her dominance over Scotland.  Lockhart Papers

In 1713 Bromley left the chair of the House to join the administration as Secretary of State for the Northern Department. He lost that office in 1714, when the new King George I installed a Whig ministry. Bromley never held government office again, but he remained the generally recognised leading Tory in the House of Commons until his health declined in the 1720s. Bromley remained an MP until his death in 1732.

He remained a strong supporter of Robert Harley, during his impeachment trial from 1715 to 1717.

Family
Bromley was married four times:
 Catherine Cloberry, daughter of Sir John Cloberry . They had one son:
 Clobery Bromley  (1685–1711)
 Trever Fortrey, daughter of Samuel Fortrey, on 21 November 1689. They had no children.
 Cecilia Swan, daughter of Sir William Swan, 1st Bt. They had one son.
 Elizabeth Stawell, daughter of Ralph Stawell, 1st Baron Stawell, on 12 January 1698. They had two sons and two daughters:
 Thomas Bromley (died 1716), of Christ Church, Oxford and the Inner Temple, M.A. at Oxford 1716
 William Bromley  (died 1737)
 Elizabeth Bromley (died 1742)
 Anne Bromley

Arms

References

The Oxford Dictionary of National Biography, Volume 7, edited by H.C.G. Mathew and Brian Harrison (Oxford University Press 2004)

Speakers of the House of Commons of Great Britain
Members of the pre-1707 Parliament of England for the University of Oxford
British MPs 1707–1708
British MPs 1708–1710
British MPs 1710–1713
British MPs 1713–1715
British MPs 1715–1722
British MPs 1722–1727
British MPs 1727–1734
Members of the Parliament of Great Britain for English constituencies
Members of the Privy Council of Great Britain
Alumni of Christ Church, Oxford
Members of the Parliament of Great Britain for Oxford University
1663 births
1732 deaths
English MPs 1690–1695
English MPs 1695–1698
English MPs 1701
English MPs 1701–1702
English MPs 1702–1705
English MPs 1705–1707